The Arakan Front Party (abbreviated AFP) is a political party in Myanmar seeking Arakanese self-determination. It was founded on 11 October 2018 by Dr. Aye Maung, former chairman of the Arakan National Party, and his colleagues, including his son Tin Maung Win.

History 
The AFP announced on 29 March 2020 that the party had elected a new leadership consisting of Aye Maung as chairperson, Kyaw Zaw Oo as Vice Chairperson, and Soe Win, Tin Maung Win, Tun Thein and Than Naing as secretaries. However, some members could not take their new leadership roles because their former party, the Arakan National Party, refused to let them resign and join the AFP. Aye Maung and Kyaw Zaw Oo are both known to be hardline nationalists.

In the 2020 general election, the AFP fielded its candidates in 42 constituencies. After the Union Election Commission cancelled the election in most of Rakhine State, the AFP's number of candidates was consequently reduced to three contesting in the House of Nationalities, five in the House of Representatives and ten in the Rakhine State Hluttaw. Out of these 18 contested seats, the AFP won one seat in the House of Representatives and two seats in the Rakhine State Hluttaw.

The AFP declined an offer by the Tatmadaw, which overthrew the elected government of Myanmar in a military coup on 1 February 2021, to accept a cabinet minister position in the State Administration Council.

References

External links 
 Arakan Front blog

2018 establishments in Myanmar
Political parties established in 2018
Political parties in Myanmar
Political parties of minorities